William Henry Playfair FRSE (15 July 1790 – 19 March 1857) was a prominent Scottish architect in the 19th century, who designed the Eastern, or Third, New Town and many of Edinburgh's neoclassical landmarks.

Life
Playfair was born on 15 July 1790 in Russell Square, London to Jessie Graham and James Playfair. His father was also an architect, and his uncles were the mathematician John Playfair and William Playfair, an economist and pioneer of statistical graphics. After his father's death he was sent to Edinburgh be educated by his uncle John Playfair. He went on to study at the University of Edinburgh, graduating in 1809. He was first articled to the architect William Stark and when Stark died in 1813, he went to London.

In the 1830s Playfair is listed as living at 17 Great Stuart Street on the prestigious Moray Estate in Edinburgh's West End. This is not a building of his own design, but is by his rival James Gillespie Graham.

Playfair joined the Free Church following the Disruption of 1843, losing his right to burial in the parish churchyard.

Playfair took David Cousin under his wing and was responsible for the latter part of his training.

Freemasonry
Playfair was Initiated into Scottish Freemasonry in Lodge St David, No.36, (Edinburgh, Scotland) on 18 January 1815.

Death
Playfair died in Edinburgh on 19 March 1857, and is buried in the "Lord's Row" on the western wall of Edinburgh's Dean Cemetery, where he designed monuments for others, including Lord Jeffrey.

Major works
Two of his finest works are the neoclassical buildings of the National Gallery of Scotland and the Royal Scottish Academy which are in the centre of Edinburgh. The Playfair Project, completed in 2004, joined the two historic buildings with an underground link.

Timeline of major projects

 1817 Appointed architect to complete design work on the Old College, University of Edinburgh, on the basis of his proposals to complete the plans originated by Robert Adam. The building was completed around 1831.
 1818 Commissioned to design Dollar Academy: the original building which he created is now known as the Playfair Building
 1818 City Observatory, Calton Hill
 1820 East New Town (Calton Hill), Edinburgh (including Regent, Carlton and Royal Terraces), built between 1821 and 1860
 1821–24 Royal Terrace, East New Town, Edinburgh only completed in 1860
 1822 Commissioned by the Institution for the Encouragement of Fine Arts in Scotland. The building was opened in 1826 and is now the Royal Scottish Academy Building, Edinburgh
 1823 Royal Circus, New Town, Edinburgh
 1824 in collaboration with Charles Robert Cockerell, designed an exact replica of the Parthenon which was to be built on top of Calton Hill as the National Monument, Edinburgh. Due to lack of investment it was never finished.
 1825 Regent and Carlton Terraces, East New Town, Edinburgh, completed in the 1830s
 1826 John Playfair Monument, (he was William Henry's uncle), Calton Hill, Edinburgh
 1827 – 1828 St Stephen's Church, St Stephen's Place, Silvermills, Edinburgh
 1829 Drumbanagher House, Armagh (demolished); London Road Gardens, Edinburgh
 1830 – 1832 For the Royal College of Surgeons of Edinburgh, Surgeons' Hall, Nicolson Street, Edinburgh
 1831 Dugald Stewart Monument, Calton Hill, Edinburgh
 circa 1837 renovations to Floors Castle, outskirts of Kelso, Scottish Borders
 1846 – 1850 New College, Edinburgh
 30 August 1850 Prince Albert laid the foundation stone of the National Gallery of Scotland, adjacent to The Royal Scottish Academy.
 1851 Donaldson's College, Edinburgh
 1859 National Gallery of Scotland opened to the public two years after Playfair's death.

Gallery of architectural work

References

Sources
Parks & Gardens, UK

Further reading
 Gow, Ian (1984): William Henry Playfair in Scottish Pioneers of the Greek Revival, The Scottish Georgian Society, Edinburgh, pp 43–55

External links

Dictionary of Scottish Architects
Dictionary of Scottish Architects- William Henry Playfair
Gazetteer for Scotland Details

1790 births
1857 deaths
Scottish architects
British neoclassical architects
Greek Revival architects
19th-century Scottish people
Fellows of the Royal Society of Edinburgh
Burials at the Dean Cemetery
Alumni of the University of Edinburgh